Elizabeth Cabezas Guerrero (b. 14 June 1963, Riobamba) is an Ecuadorian economist and politician. She was elected the President of the National Assembly on 14 March 2018.

Political career
She was next elected to the National Assembly in the 2017 Ecuadorian general election to represent Pichincha Province and the PAIS Alliance. Her election was criticized by the Popularity Unity party, who alleged electoral fraud.

President of the National Assembly

Following the dismissal of José Serrano Salgado from his office and the shakeup in the PAIS Alliance headed by Lenín Moreno, Cabezas was elected the new President of the National Assembly on 14 March 2018. The portion of the PAIS Alliance still loyal to Rafael Correa denounced her election as unconstitutional.

Citations

Living people
1963 births
People from Riobamba
Members of the National Congress (Ecuador)
PAIS Alliance politicians
Universidad Católica de Santiago de Guayaquil alumni
20th-century Ecuadorian economists
Ecuadorian women economists
Presidents of the National Assembly (Ecuador)
21st-century Ecuadorian women politicians
21st-century Ecuadorian politicians